The New Zealand Space Agency is the public service department of New Zealand charged with "space policy, regulation and business development"  relating to space activities in New Zealand.

History

The New Zealand Space Agency was formed in April 2016 under the country's Ministry of Business, Innovation and Employment. The aim of the agency is to promote the development of a space industry in New Zealand and to reap its economic benefits. The government also established the space agency to regulate the country's growing commercial space industry. This includes space launches by the New Zealand subsidiary of Rocket Lab, a U.S. aerospace company, and creating new regulation in partnership with the Civil Aviation Authority of New Zealand to fly a suborbital spaceplane from conventional airports.

Spaceflight programs

MethaneSAT
In November 2019 the agency signed a partnership with the Environmental Defense Fund and American Non-governmental organization to work on MethaneSAT, an Earth observation satellite that will study human methane emissions in order to better track and combat climate change. As part of the partnership NZSA will contribute $26 Million and a New Zealand-based mission control centre to the project. The mission marks New Zealand's first space science mission and is scheduled for launch in 2022.

On 19 August 2020 NZSA named Dr Sara Mikaloff-Fletcher, a former carbon cycling expert at NIWA as lead scientist on the mission.

Artemis Accords 
On 1 June 2021, the NZSA signed the Artemis Accords, making New Zealand the 11th signatory of the accords. An announcement released the same day stated, "New Zealand has joined an international arrangement to co-operate with NASA on peaceful exploration and activity in outer space. Foreign Minister Nanaia Mahuta and Economic Development Minister Stuart Nash announced the government has agreed to join the Artemis Accords, launched by the U.S. National Aeronautics and Space Administration, and now signed by eleven nations." NASA administrator Bill Nelson later congratulated the agency.

NZ-USA Space Framework Agreement 
On 9 August 2022, New Zealand and the United States signed a framework agreement to launch new opportunities for space sector. Stuart Nash signed the Framework Agreement with United States Deputy Secretary of State, Wendy Sherman. The signing followed Prime Minister Jacinda Ardern and Vice President Kamala Harris welcoming of the completion of negotiations on this agreement during their meeting in Washington, DC on 31 May 2022.

See also
 List of government space agencies

References

External links
 

New Zealand Public Service departments
Space programme of New Zealand
Space agencies